James Walter Wall (May 26, 1820June 9, 1872) was an American politician who served as a United States Senator from New Jersey in 1863, a leader of the Peace movement during the American Civil War. A member of the Democratic Party, he was the son of U.S. Senator Garret Dorset Wall.

Biography
Born in Trenton, New Jersey, he was tutored privately in Flushing, Queens, and graduated from the College of New Jersey (now Princeton University) in 1838. He studied law and was admitted to the bar in 1841 and commenced practice in Trenton. Served as commissioner in bankruptcy.

Wall moved to Burlington, New Jersey in 1847, and was elected Mayor of Burlington, New Jersey in 1850; he was nominated for the Democratic nomination for Congress in 1850, but declined. He was an unsuccessful candidate for election in 1854 to the Thirty-fourth United States Congress. Wall supported John C. Breckinridge in the presidential election of 1860, then was involved in the "editorial direction of the New York Daily News, a peace organ that the government suppressed in August 1861."

The 12 September 1861 edition of The New York Times reported the arrest of Wall on charges of "secession proclivities". There was a rumor in Trenton that other arrests would be made. He was confined in Fort Lafayette for several weeks. Political prisoner Wall was released with George L. Bowne and Pierce Butler (married to Frances ("Fanny") Kemble).

Released after pledging allegiance to the Union, Wall wrote a letter to the editor stating: "There, if the great principles of constitutional liberty are not a delusion and a snare, and our boasted freedom a sham, may yet be found a place of refuge for liberty against despotism -- the oppressed from the oppressor." Wall, a newspaper editor, was alluding to the presence of Simon Cameron at the bar of the Continental Hotel in Philadelphia.  Cameron had ordered his arrest.  The New York Times published Wall's letter on the first anniversary of the Pratt Street Riot.

Wall was elected by the New Jersey legislature as a Democrat to the United States Senate to fill the vacancy caused by the death of John Renshaw Thomson and served from January 14 to March 3, 1863. He was an unsuccessful candidate for reelection.

Wall was a shameless literary plagiarist: entire pages of description of Italy in his 1856 book Foreign Etchings were stolen without attribution from a 1849 book Notes of a two years' residence in Italy by the Irishman Hamilton Geale.

Wall resumed the practice of law in Burlington; also engaged in literary pursuits. He moved to Elizabeth, New Jersey in 1869, where he died, aged 52. He was buried in Saint Mary's Episcopal Churchyard in Burlington, New Jersey.

References

External links
 
 Retrieved on 2009-04-27
James Walter Wall at The Political Graveyard

Bibliography
 Wall, James. The Constitution: Originating in Compromise, It Can Only Be Preserved by Adhering to Its Spirit, and Observing Its Every Obligation. Philadelphia: King & Baird, 1862
 Wall, James. Speeches for the Times by Hon. James W. Wall, of New Jersey. New York: J. Walter & Co., 1864.

1820 births
1872 deaths
People of New Jersey in the American Civil War
New Jersey lawyers
Politicians from Elizabeth, New Jersey
Politicians from Trenton, New Jersey
Princeton University alumni
Democratic Party United States senators from New Jersey
New Jersey Democrats
Mayors of Burlington, New Jersey
19th-century American politicians
19th-century American lawyers